The Curragh is a flat open plain of almost  of common land in County Kildare. This area is well known for Irish horse breeding and training. The Irish National Stud is located on the edge of Kildare town, beside the famous Japanese Gardens. Also located here is Pollardstown Fen, the largest fen in Ireland. This area is of particular interest to botanists and ecologists because of the numerous bird species that nest and visit there.  There are also many rare plants that grow there.

It is composed of a sandy soil formed after an esker deposited a sand load and as a result, it has excellent drainage characteristics. This makes it a popular location for training racehorses.

History 

Used as a meeting site during Pre-Christian societies, the Curragh is shrouded in mythology. The hill to the north of the Curragh is called the Hill of Allen (Almhain) and is the purported meeting place of the mythical Fianna. Legend has it that in about 480 AD, when St Brigid became intent on founding a monastery in Kildare, she asked the High King of Leinster for the land on which to build it. When he granted her as much land as her cloak would cover, she then placed her cloak on the ground to cover the entire Curragh plain.

On 1 April 1234, The 3rd Earl of Pembroke lost a battle at the Curragh against a group of men loyal to King Henry III of England. Lord Pembroke was wounded in the battle and died at his castle at Kilkenny on 16 April.

It was a common site for mustering the armies of the Pale (see Essex in Ireland). During the 1798 Rebellion there was a massacre in the Curragh at Gibbet Rath. The Curragh Camp is now located there, where the Irish Defence Forces undergo training.

At a natural bowl-shaped amphitheatre on the Curragh known locally as Donnelly's Hollow the Irish champion boxer Dan Donnelly defeated the English champion George Cooper in 1815, before a large crowd. Donnelly had a famed reach and the remains of his arm were on show until recently in the Hideout Pub in the nearby town of Kilcullen.

In 1866, a commission was appointed by the British Treasury to report into the use made of the Curragh and make recommendations on legislation. It reported in 1868, and led to the Curragh of Kildare Act, 1868.

On 2 January 1941 the Curragh was bombed by the Luftwaffe, the air force of the Third Reich, causing slight damage. One SC250 bomb remains unaccounted for.

Legal recognition 
The earliest mention of the Curragh in legal documents was 1299, when an Act was passed, to prevent swine from feeding on the Curragh plains to the detriment of the sward.

In 1865 the houses of parliament set up a commission to examine the Curragh. The findings of this led to the enactment of the Curragh of Kildare Act 1868. This created the honorary position of a Ranger tasked with the care, management and preservation of the Curragh for the purpose of horseracing and training of horses.

The 1868 act also provided for a second commission to report on the use of the Curragh for common pasture. This report is detailed in the 1870 Curragh of Kildare act. This act specifies sheep grazing rights for the Curragh.

After the Anglo Irish treaty of 1921 the lands of the Curragh passed from the Crown to the Minister for Finance of the Irish State.

In 1961 a new Curragh of Kildare Act repealed the 1868 act and sections of the 1870 act. It also abolished the office of the Ranger and transferred its duties to the department of Defence.

Military 
There has been a permanent military presence in the curragh since 1856. The Curragh Camp is now home to the Defence Forces Training Centre of the Irish Defence Forces.

Wrens of the Curragh 

Records of women, known as Wrens of the Curragh, who were paid for sex work by soldiers at the camp, go back to the 1840s. They lived in 'nests' half-hollowed out of banks and ditches, which were covered in furze bushes; their lifestyle was communal - money and resources were shared amongst the (up to 60) women who lived there. Whilst many women were sex workers, others had common-law marriages to soldiers but were barred from living within the camp itself. The women's presence is no longer reported after the 1880s.

Sport

Horse racing
The Curragh Racecourse on the plain is Ireland's Premier Flat Racecourse. Every year, it hosts all five classic races in the racing calendar: the Irish Derby Stakes, the Irish Oaks, the Irish 1,000 Guineas, the Irish 2,000 Guineas and the Irish St. Leger.

Motor racing

On 2 July 1903, the Gordon Bennett Cup ran through the Curragh. It was the first international motor race to be held in what was then the United Kingdom of Great Britain and Ireland. The Automobile Club of Great Britain and Ireland wanted the race to be hosted in the United Kingdom (as it existed then), and Ireland was suggested as the venue because racing was illegal on British public roads. Following a lobbying campaign, local laws were adjusted, and Kildare was chosen on the basis of the straightness its roads. As a compliment to Ireland, the British team chose to race in Shamrock green which later became known as British racing green. The route consisted of several loops of a circuit that passed-through Kilcullen, the Curragh, Kildare, Monasterevin, Stradbally, Castledermot, Carlow, and Athy. The  race was won by the Belgian racer Camille Jenatzy, driving a Mercedes.

After The Emergency both motor cars and motorcycle racing took place on occasions drawing crowds up to 30,000. For eight years from 1947 until 1954 cars competed, while motorcycle racing continued until 1967. The first race was run by the Leinster Motor Club on 12 July 1947 over a  course known as the "Short circuit" but eight years later the death of Don Beauman during at a different Irish venue plus other fatal racing accidents in 1955 brought an end to motor car racing at the Curragh. The 1951 Wakefield Trophy was won by the then 22-year-old Stirling Moss.

Education
The Curragh Camp has two primary schools (national schools); Curragh Girls' National School, Curragh Boys' National School. It has one secondary school, the Curragh Post Primary School (PPS), which has been situated beside the parade ground since 1933. Curragh Girls' School and Curragh PPS have approximately 200 pupils with a population of 191 as of 2015/16 school year. The Curragh Boys' School has 112 pupils.

Cultural references

The Curragh plains were used to film the battle scenes in the film Braveheart.
An Irish folk song is called The Curragh of Kildare.
The 2020 film Dating Amber was filmed and set in the Curragh.

See also
Curragh Incident

Notes
a.  According to Leinster Leader, 11 April 1903, Britain had to choose a different colour to its usual national colours of red, white and blue, as these had already been taken by Italy, Germany and France respectively. It also stated red as the colour for American cars in the 1903 Gordon Bennett Cup.

References

External links
Curragh history and information

Ireland's oldest golf course
The Curragh Racecourse

Geography of County Kildare
Sports venues in County Kildare
Tourist attractions in County Kildare
Archaeological sites in County Kildare